André Biancarelli (born 12 March 1970) is a French professional football coach and former player who played as a goalkeeper. As of 2022, he is a goalkeeping coach for  club Saint-Étienne.

Coaching career 
From 2006 to 2009, Biancarelli was a goalkeeping coach for Monaco. He worked in this role for Tours from 2009 to 2015 and Toulouse from 2015 to 2018. In 2020, he was a goalkeeping coach for his former club  before joining Saint-Étienne, also in the role of goalkeeping coach.

Honours 
Bastia

 Coupe de la Ligue runner-up: 1994–95

Metz

 UEFA Intertoto Cup runner-up: 1999

Monaco

 Trophée des Champions: 2000

References

External links 

 

1970 births
Living people
Sportspeople from Avignon
French footballers
French people of Corsican descent
Footballers from Corsica
Association football goalkeepers

SC Bastia players
FC Metz players
AS Monaco FC players
Ligue 2 players
Ligue 1 players
Corsica international footballers
Association football goalkeeping coaches
AS Monaco FC non-playing staff
Tours FC non-playing staff
Toulouse FC non-playing staff
AS Saint-Étienne non-playing staff
Footballers from Provence-Alpes-Côte d'Azur